Rain, Part 2 is a live EP from Planetshakers, recorded in Planetshakers Conferences in the Philippines and Malaysia. It was released on 12 April 2019 by  Planetshakers Ministries International and Venture3Media.

Critical reception

Joshua Andre, of 365 Days of Inspiring Media, considered that only one song ("Only Way") on the album had "emotional impact", but conceded that it is "the most personal and emotional song that Planetshakers have ever recorded", and noted that it was inspired by lead singer Joth Hunt's surgery to remove a cancerous tumor. Rating the album three stars for Jesus Freak Hideout, Bert Gangl considered it to be "pleasant enough", but felt that the band had reached "the point of diminishing returns".

Track listing

References

2019 live albums
Planetshakers albums